W. Royal Stokes (né William Royal Stokes; 27 June 1930 – 1 May 2021 Elkins, West Virginia) was an American writer, music journalist, and music historian.

Books
 
 The Jazz Scene: An Informal History from New Orleans to 1990. Oxford University Press, 1991
 
 Living the Jazz Life: Conversations with Forty Musicians about Their Careers in Jazz. Oxford University Press, 2000
 Growing Up With Jazz: Twenty-Four Musicians Talk About Their Lives and Careers. Oxford University Press, 2005
 The Essential W. Royal Stokes: Jazz, Blues, and Beyond. Hannah Books, 2020

Bibliography

Notes

References 

  ;  (US Newsstream database).

  ;  (US Newsstream database).

External links
W. Royal Stokes

1930 births
2021 deaths
Writers from Washington, D.C.